Chronchitis is American band Slightly Stoopid's fifth studio album, produced by Mario C, Paul Leary, Miguel and Chris DiBeneditto, released on August 7, 2007 on Stoopid Records/Controlled Substance Sound Labs. This album features artists such as G Love, Guru of Gang Starr, Angelo Moore of Fishbone, Toko Tasi and Money Mark.

The album debuted at number 55 on the U.S. Billboard 200, selling about 12,000 copies in its first week.

Chronichitis was released in Japan on June 4, 2008 on Powerslave Records with six bonus tracks.

Track listing
All tracks by Slightly Stoopid except where noted

"Anywhere I Go" – 4:27
"The Otherside" (feat. Guru) – 3:12
"Hold on to the One" – 3:42
"2am" – 4:59
"Blood of My Blood" – 3:14
"Nobody Knows" – 3:48
"Above the Clouds" – 3:59
"Digital" – 3:49
"Round the World" – 3:22
"Baby I Like It" (feat. G. Love) – 4:15
"Ocean" – 3:19
"Jimi" – 3:46
"Breakbeat" (feat. DJ Hellnaw) – 3:56
"Mind on Your Music" – 2:17
"Ever Really Wanted" (feat. Angelo Moore) – 4:01
"Girl U So Fine" / "Girl U So Fine, Pt. 2" (feat. Toko Tasi) – 5:54
"Reward for Me" (Joe Higgs) – 2:49

Japan Release Bonus Tracks
"No Cocaine (feat. Inner Circle)"
"False Rhythms"
"She Bangz"
"London Dub"
"The Fruits “Legalize Them”"
"Ain't No Reason to Go"

Charts

Personnel 

Brad Bell – Assistant Engineer
Jeffrey Lamont Brown – Photography
Mario Caldato, Jr. – Producer, Engineer, Mixing
C-Money - Trumpet, Keyboards
Dela – Saxophone
Chris DiBeneditto – Producer, Engineer, Mixing
DJ Hell Naw – Turntables
Miles Doughty – Bass, Guitar, Vocals, Group Member
Brian Gardner – Mastering
Lizzie Garlinghouse – Publicity
Michael "Miguel" Happoldt – Producer, Engineer, Mixing, Tracking
Paul Leary – Piano (Electric), Producer, Engineer, Mixing, Wurlitzer
Kyle McDonald – Bass, Guitar, Vocals, Engineer, Group Member
Money Mark – Synthesizer, Piano, Vibraphone
Oscar Monsalve – Engineer
Angelo Moore – Performer
Ryan Moran (RyMo) – Drums, Group Member
Oguer Ocon – Harmonica, Percussion, Group Member
Jon Phillips – Management
Matt Phillips – Management
Stuart MacKay Smith – Artwork, Layout Design
Solaar – Engineer
Stuart Sullivan – Engineer, Mixing
Mike Sutherland – Engineer, Assistant Engineer
Toko Tasi – Performer

Other
This was to be the first studio album released by Slightly Stoopid that did not feature any punk rock themed tracks (with exception to the Japanese release which features tracks "She Bangz" and "Ain't No Reason To Go". Both of which can be found on their later release Slightly Not Stoned Enough To Eat Breakfast Yet Stoopid in America.)

References

Slightly Stoopid albums
2007 albums
Albums produced by Paul Leary
Albums recorded at Kingsize Soundlabs